Events in the year 1906 in Germany.

Establishments 
 Hamburg Hauptbahnhof opens
 The 4th Mounted Rifles regiment is formed
 Basilica of the Visitation of Our Lady, Werl is completed

Incumbents

National level
 Kaiser – Wilhelm II
 Chancellor – Bernhard von Bülow

State level

Kingdoms
 King of Bavaria – Otto of Bavaria
 King of Prussia – Kaiser Wilhelm II
 King of Saxony – Frederick Augustus III of Saxony
 King of Württemberg – William II of Württemberg

Grand Duchies
 Grand Duke of Baden – Frederick I
 Grand Duke of Hesse – Ernest Louis
 Grand Duke of Mecklenburg-Schwerin – Frederick Francis IV
 Grand Duke of Mecklenburg-Strelitz – Adolphus Frederick V
 Grand Duke of Oldenburg – Frederick Augustus II
 Grand Duke of Saxe-Weimar-Eisenach – William Ernest

Principalities
 Schaumburg-Lippe – George, Prince of Schaumburg-Lippe
 Schwarzburg-Rudolstadt – Günther Victor, Prince of Schwarzburg-Rudolstadt
 Schwarzburg-Sondershausen – Karl Günther, Prince of Schwarzburg-Sondershausen
 Principality of Lippe – Leopold IV, Prince of Lippe
 Reuss Elder Line – Heinrich XXIV, Prince Reuss of Greiz (regent Heinrich XIV, Prince Reuss Younger Line)
 Reuss Younger Line – Heinrich XIV, Prince Reuss Younger Line
 Waldeck and Pyrmont – Friedrich, Prince of Waldeck and Pyrmont

Duchies
 Duke of Anhalt – Frederick II, Duke of Anhalt
 Duke of Brunswick – Prince Albert of Prussia (regent) to 13 September, then vacant
 Duke of Saxe-Altenburg – Ernst I, Duke of Saxe-Altenburg
 Duke of Saxe-Coburg and Gotha – Charles Edward, Duke of Saxe-Coburg and Gotha
 Duke of Saxe-Meiningen – Georg II, Duke of Saxe-Meiningen

Colonial Governors
 Cameroon (Kamerun) – Jesko von Puttkamer (9th and final term) to January, then Oberst Müller (acting governor) to November, then Otto Gleim (acting governor) (2nd term)
 Kiaochow (Kiautschou) – Oskar von Truppel
 German East Africa (Deutsch-Ostafrika) – Gustav Adolf von Götzen to 15 April, then Georg Albrecht Freiherr von Rechenberg
 German New Guinea (Deutsch-Neuguinea) – Albert Hahl (2nd term)
 German Samoa (Deutsch-Samoa) – Wilhelm Solf
 German South-West Africa (Deutsch-Südwestafrika) – Friedrich von Lindequist
 Togoland – Johann Nepomuk Graf Zech auf Neuhofen

Births
 2 February – Dietrich Bonhoeffer, German theologian (died 1945)
 3 March – Will Eisenmann, German-Swiss composer (died 1992)
 19 May – Gerd Bucerius, German journalist (died 1995)
 6 June – Max August Zorn, German-born American mathematician (died 1993)
 19 June – Ernst Boris Chain, German biochemist (died 1979)
 28 June – Maria Goeppert-Mayer, German theoretical physicist, and Nobel laureate in Physics (died 1972)
 2 July – Hans Bethe, German-born American physicist, Nobel Prize laureate (died 2005)
 14 October – Hannah Arendt, German political theorist and writer (died 1975)
 18 November – Klaus Mann, German writer (died 1949)
 25 December – Ernst Ruska, German physicist, Nobel Prize in Physics (died 1988)
 Date unknown:
 Josef Stürmann,  a Munich philosopher (died 1959)

Deaths 
 8 February – Wilhelm von Christ, (born 1831)
 10 February – Anton Hermann Albrecht, German poet (born 1835)
 19 February – Wilhelm Heyd, German historian (born 1823)
 8 March – Hermann Rogalla von Bieberstein, German-American engineer and politician (born 1823)
 10 March – Eugen Richter, German politician (born 1838)
 17 March – Johann Most, German-American anarchist (born 1846)
 21 March – Carl von Siemens, German industrialist (born 1829)
 14 May – Carl Schurz, German revolutionary and US statesman (born 1829)
 27 May – Erich Zweigert, German politician (born 1849)
 5 June – Eduard von Hartmann, German philosopher (born 1842)
 5 July – Paul Karl Ludwig Drude, German physician (born 1863)
 25 August – Max von Eyth, German engineer (born 1836)
 13 September – Prince Albert of Prussia, Prussian general field marshal and regent of the Duchy of Brunswick (born 1837)
 19 October – Karl Pfizer, German chemist (born 1824)
 22 October – Emil Ludwig Schmidt, German anthropologist (born 1837)
 7 November – Heinrich Seidel, German engineer (born 1842)
 31 December – Friedrich Gumpert, German professor (born 1841)

References

 
Years of the 20th century in Germany
Germany
Germany